White Hills is an American psychedelic rock band that was formed in 2003 in New York City. Founding members Dave W. (guitar & vocals) and Ego Sensation (bass & vocals) have been the only constant members.

They are known for being one of the most prolific bands of their generation, recording over 40 separate releases including 7 full-length studio albums. Their music strikes “a riveting balance between heaviness and ethereality”  combining elements of krautrock, post-punk, art rock, goth, psychedelic rock, metal, stoner rock, ambient and experimental music. They are often compared to Iggy Pop and the Stooges, Pink Floyd, Hawkwind, MC5 and Spiritualized.

Biography
The band is currently signed to Thrill Jockey Records whose artist roster also includes Future Islands, Wooden Shjips, Tortoise, The Sea and Cake, Matmos, Liturgy and Trans Am. The band's first album, No Game To Play, was a solo recording project by Dave W released in 2005. Julian Cope issued a limited remix of the album as They’ve Got Blood Like We’ve Got Blood on his Fuck Off and Di label. The band's next album Glitter Glamour Atrocity (self-released) garnered the attention of Stewart Lee from the Sunday London Times  creating sudden visibility for the group. Shortly after, UK label Rocket Recordings (Goat, Teeth of the Sea, GNOD) asked the band to record a third album.  The band recorded Heads on Fire, the title track of which did not make it onto the album but appears on the tour-only CD-r Oddity II- Night Scene On Mill Mountain. Rocket went on to release a split 12” with WHITE HILLS and The Heads and a collaboration between WHITE HILLS and GNOD before the band signed with Thrill Jockey in 2009.

Upon signing to Thrill Jockey in 2009, the label released the 12” EP Dead followed a few months later by the band's self-titled album. Recorded at the Ocropolis in Brooklyn, Oneida’s now extinct recording studio, the album features Kid Millions on drums and was reportedly recorded over three days.  The band went on to record their career-defining H-p1 at the Ocropolis. Hailed as “quite possibly the finest album of space rock”, H-p1 has been described as a “work of science fiction”, the band citing Abstract Expressionist art  as muse and a concern for “societal ills like consumerism and corporate control of government”  as motivation. The title's meaning, according to Dave W, “is the name I have given to this disease of greed…that plagues our time…in the same way that scientists name viruses.”

The band's next two full-length albums Frying On This Rock (2012) and So You Are…So You’ll Be (2013) were recorded with Nick Ferrante on drums by Martin Bisi at BC Studios in Brooklyn. Bisi, well known for his work with Sonic Youth, Swans, The Dresden Dolls, Herbie Hancock and John Zorn among others, helped the band achieve crisper tones than on their previous releases.

Their discography covers a wide expanse of sonic ground. Dave W, the principle lyricist for the band, has cited Jim Carroll  and Buckminster Fuller as inspirations and has been quoted as saying, “I’m very conscious about making the records sound very different from each other.”

The band has several live releases in their discography including the full-length album Live At Roadburn from their performance in 2011 and a Scion released 10” split with Earthless from their 2012 performance at the Roxy in Los Angeles.

In Fall of 2014, the band convened in Bethesda, Wales at Bryn Derwyn studio to record an album with producer David Wrench, best known for his work with Caribou and FKA twigs. The album Walks For Motorists was released in April 2015.

In May 2017, their album Stop Mute Defeat was released.

On October 23, 2020, their album Splintered Metal Sky was released on UK label God Unknown Records.

White Hills' live shows feature dramatic lighting and the usage of a fog machine. Previous auxiliary (recording / touring) members include: Antronhy (drums, various instruments), Nick Name (drums), Bob Bellomo (drums), Daved Pankenier, Kid Millions, Shazzula, and Pierre Auntour. They have shared stages with bands such as MONO, The Flaming Lips, Sleepy Sun, Cloudland Canyon, Mudhoney, Akron/Family, Monster Magnet, Oneida, Pontiak, and The Cult.

Movie Credits
Legendary independent filmmaker Jim Jarmusch became a fan  of WHITE HILLS after inviting the band to perform at the All Tomorrow's Parties New York 2010 weekend he curated along with Iggy Pop and The Stooges, Sleep, Sonic Youth, Sunn O))) and Boris. Jarmusch contacted the band in March 2012 asking them to play themselves performing their 2007 song "Under Skin Or By Name"  in his new film, Only Lovers Left Alive. The script denotes a “visually striking band” playing wild music in a Detroit club. Jarmusch said he felt the part was made for WHITE HILLS. The band shares the screen with Tilda Swinton, Tom Hiddleston, Mia Wasikowska and Anton Yelchin. When the film was released in December 2013 in Germany, the band joined with other artists from the soundtrack including Jarmusch's band SQÜRL, Jozef van Wissem, Zola Jesus and Yasmine Hamdan to do a series of traveling live performances following the screenings of the film in Cologne, Berlin, London, Paris and New York.

In 2014, the band also appeared in Sound and Chaos: The Story of BC Studios directed by Sara Leavitt and Ryan C. Douglass. This documentary chronicles the birth and life of Martin Bisi’s legendary recording and production studio co-founded by multi-instrumentalist and collaborator-extraordinaire Bill Laswell. Initially funded by Brian Eno (much of his album On Land was recorded there), the studio went on to host a who's-who of NYC musicians: White Zombie, J.G. Thirlwell, Afrika Bambaataa, Cop Shoot Cop, and many more. The film includes footage of WHITE HILLS in BC Studios during their Frying On This Rock sessions. The film made its New York premiere at Anthology Film Archives on July 17, 2014.

Discography

Albums 
 No Game to Play (White Hills, 2003, 2006, 2009 / 300mics 2016)
 They've Got Blood Like We've Got Blood (Fuck Off And Di / Head Heritage, 2005)
 Koko (White Hills, 2006)
 Glitter Glamour Atrocity (White Hills, 2007)
 Abstractions and Mutations (White Hills, 2007 / Thrill Jockey, 2009 / Immune, 2012)
 Heads on Fire (Rocket, 2007 / Thrill Jockey 2009, 2012, 2015)
 A Little Bliss Forever (Drug Space, 2008)
 Oddity... A Look at How the Collective Mind Works (Drug Space, 2010)
 White Hills (Thrill Jockey, 2010)
 H-p1 (Thrill Jockey, 2011)
 Live at Roadburn 2011 (Roadburn, 2011)
 Oddity III: Basic Information (Drug Space, 2012)
 Frying on This Rock (Thrill Jockey, 2012)
 So You Are... So You'll Be (Thrill Jockey, 2013)
 Walks For Motorists (Thrill Jockey, 2015)
 Stop Mute Defeat (Thrill Jockey, 2017)
 Splintered Metal Sky (God Unknown, 2020)

EPs
 No Kind Ending, Vol. 2 (White Hills, 2008)
 Dead (Thrill Jockey, 2009)
 Stolen Stars Left for No One (Thrill Jockey, 2010)
 Black Valleys (Aquarius, 2011)
 yes no Live at the Delancey with Borts Minorts (DogAndPanda, 2015) (collaboration)

Single
 "Measured Energy" (7") (Trensmat, 2011)

Compilation
 Oddity II: Night Scene on Mill Mountain (Drug Space, 2010)

References

External links
 Tumblr (Official website)
 Reviews and biography at AllMusic
 Thrill Jockey Records biography & discography
 Discography at Discogs
 Dave W. interviewed in Prefix magazine, Oct. 2010
 Concert posters at GigPosters

Musical groups from New York City
Psychedelic rock music groups from New York (state)
American stoner rock musical groups
Thrill Jockey artists